Ecoforestry has been defined as selection forestry or restoration forestry. The main idea of ecoforestry is to maintain or restore the forest to standards where the forest may still be harvested for products on a sustainable basis. Ecoforestry is forestry that emphasizes holistic practices which strive to protect and restore ecosystems rather than maximize economic productivity. Sustainability of the forest also comes with uncertainties. There are other factors that may affect the forest furthermore than that of the harvesting. There are internal conditions such as effects of soil compaction, tree damage, disease, fire, and blow down that also directly affect the ecosystem. These factors have to be taken into account when determining the sustainability of a forest. If these factors are added to the harvesting and production that comes out of the forest, then the forest will become less likely to survive, and will then become less sustainable.

Since the forest is considered an ecosystem, it is dependent on all of the living and non-living factors within itself. This is a major part of why the forest needs to be sustainable before it is harvested. For example, a tree, by way of photosynthesis, converts sunlight to sugars for respiration to keep the tree alive. The remains of the converted sugars is left in roots for consumption by the organisms surrounding the tree in the habitat. This shows the productivity of an ecosystem with its inhabitants. Productivity within the ecosystem cannot come to fruition unless the forest is sustainable enough to be harvested. If most individual organisms of the ecosystem vanish, the ecosystem itself is at risk. Once that happens, there is no longer any forest to harvest from. The overall productivity of a system can be found in an equation where the Net Primary Production, or NPP, is equal to the Gross Primary Production, or GPP, minus the Respiration, or R. The formula is the NPP = GPP - R. The NPP is the overall efficiency of the plants in the ecosystem. Through having a constant efficiency in NPP, the ecosystem is then more sustainable. The GPP refers to the rate of energy stored by photosynthesis in plants. The R refers to the maintenance and reproduction of plants from the energy expended.

Ecoforestry has many principles within the existence of itself. It covers sustainable development and the fair harvesting of the organisms living within the forest ecosystem. There have been many proposals of principles outlined for ecoforestry. They are covered over books, articles, and environmental agencies. All of the principles relate to the idea that in ecoforestry, less should be harvested, and diversity must be managed. Through harvesting less, there is enough biomass left in the forest, so that the forest may stay healthy and still stay maintained. It will grow at a sustainable level annually, and thus it will be able to still be harvested the following year. Through management of the diversity, species may cohabitate in an ecosystem where the forest may feed off of other species in its growth and production. The Principles of Ecoforestry may be found below.

Principles of ecoforestry
The principles of ecoforestry are:

See also

 Arid Forest Research Institute
 Conservation biology
 Conservation communities
 Conservation ethic
 Conservation movement
 Close to nature forestry
 Ecology
 Environmental protection
 Habitat conservation
 Indian Council of Forestry Research and Education

References

External links
 Ecoforestry Institute Society
 Trust for Sustainable Forestry
 Living Forest Communities
 Ecoforestry in Papua New Guinea case study
 "What is ecoforestry?"

Sustainable forest management
World forestry
Environmental issues with forests
History of forestry